Copris lecontei is a species of dung beetle in the family Scarabaeidae.

Subspecies
These two subspecies belong to the species Copris lecontei:
 Copris lecontei isthmiensis Matthews, 1961
 Copris lecontei lecontei Matthews, 1962

References

Further reading

 

Coprini
Articles created by Qbugbot
Beetles described in 1962